Vanity Fair was a British television series which aired during 1939 on the BBC. It was a series about fashion, and was hosted by Bettie Cameron Smail. It aired in a 15-minute time-slot.

One episode discussed a wardrobe assembled for £20. Another episode discussed the Paris trends in autumn fashions.

None of the episodes is known to still exist. They aired live, and methods used to record live television did not exist until late 1947, and were used very rarely by the BBC until the mid-1950s.

References

External links

1930s British television series
1939 British television series debuts
1939 British television series endings
Lost BBC episodes
BBC Television shows
Fashion-themed television series
Black-and-white British television shows
British live television series